The 2023 Vitas Gerulaitis Cup was a professional tennis tournament played on indoor hard courts. It was the first edition of the tournament which was part of the 2023 ATP Challenger Tour. It took place in Vilnius, Lithuania between 6 and 12 February 2023.

Singles main-draw entrants

Seeds

 1 Rankings are as of 30 January 2023.

Other entrants
The following players received wildcards into the singles main draw:
  Edas Butvilas
  Vilius Gaubas
  Cem İlkel

The following players received entry into the singles main draw as alternates:
  Michael Geerts
  Kacper Żuk
  Mats Moraing
  Nino Serdarušić

The following players received entry from the qualifying draw:
  Egor Gerasimov
  Ergi Kırkın
  Daniel Masur
  Julian Ocleppo
  Mats Rosenkranz
  Denis Yevseyev

Champions

Singles

 Liam Broady def.  Zdeněk Kolář 6–4, 6–4.

Doubles

 Ivan Liutarevich /  Vladyslav Manafov def.  Arjun Kadhe /  Daniel Masur 6–0, 6–2.

Exhibition
As part of the event, an exhibition of unseen photographies of Vitas Gerulaitis life has been launched in the SEB Arena.

References

2023 ATP Challenger Tour
2023 in Lithuanian sport
February 2023 sports events in Europe